Farid Abedi (born August 28, 1977 in Firouzabad) is an Iranian footballer. He currently plays for Bargh Shiraz in Azadegan League.

Club Career Statistics

Last Update  5 June 2010 

 Assist Goals

References
 Iran Pro League Stats

1977 births
Living people
Iranian footballers
Rah Ahan players
Bargh Shiraz players
Persian Gulf Pro League players
Azadegan League players
People from Firuzabad, Fars
Association football forwards
Sportspeople from Fars province